Malekabad (also Romanized as Malekābād; also known as Qal‘eh-i-Malakābād and Qal‘eh-ye Malekābād) is a village in Qarah Chaman Rural District, Arzhan District, Shiraz County, Fars Province, Iran. At the 2006 census, its population was 85, in 16 families.

References 

Populated places in Shiraz County